The Judaeo-Spanish Wikipedia or Ladino Wikipedia is the Judaeo-Spanish-language version of Wikipedia. It was approved on December 21, 2006, but its earliest articles date to August 2006.

Current status
The Judaeo-Spanish Wikipedia had 3,624 articles as of March 9th, 2023. There were  registered users (including bots);  were active at that time, including  administrators.

Although Judaeo-Spanish was historically written in Hebrew script, today it is often written in Latin script. Judaeo-Spanish Wikipedia has content in both scripts, with the great majority of content in Latin script. This Latin script content reflects several different orthographic conventions that are variously used for Judaeo-Spanish.

Point of view
Judeo-Spanish is the historical language of the Sephardi Jews, and the largest concentration of its speakers is in Israel. Accordingly, much of the content of this encyclopedia—especially content not found in other Wikipedia projects—focuses on Sephardi Jewish culture and personalities, and on places and institutions of Israel.

See also 

 Hebrew Wikipedia
 Yiddish Wikipedia

References

External links

  Judaeo-Spanish Wikipedia
  Judaeo-Spanish Wikipedia mobile version

Wikipedias by language
Wikipedias in Romance languages
Internet properties established in 2006
Jewish encyclopedias
Wikipedia